Rubén Castillo (born 24 April 1985) is a Chilean former footballer.

His last club was Arturo Fernández Vial.

Honours

Club
Cobreloa
 Primera División de Chile (3): 2003–A, 2003–C, 2004–C

References
 
 

1985 births
Living people
Chilean footballers
C.D. Arturo Fernández Vial footballers
Lota Schwager footballers
Cobreloa footballers
Chilean Primera División players
Segunda División Profesional de Chile players
Association football fullbacks